Murray's Magazine was a monthly magazine published by the John Murray publishing house. Sixty issues were published, from January 1887 through to December 1891. 
It was priced at 1/- (one shilling).

The magazine included limited amounts of fiction, including works by 
 Thomas Hardy
 Vernon Lee (as "Amour Dure") in January 1887
 Emily Lawless
 Lucas Malet
 Axel Munthe ("For Those Who Love Music", later collected in Memories and Vagaries)
 Margaret L. Woods

Non-fictional works include:

 Richard Corney Grain's autobiography
articles on music by composer Mary Augusta Wakefield

References

Further reading
Time, Murray's Magazine, & The Quarto - Indexes to Fiction (Victorian Fiction Research Guide)
Georgiana, Dowager Lady De Ros. Personal Recollections of the Duke of Wellington Reprinted from Murray's Magazine 1889 Part I.
 Murray's Magazine archive at HathiTrust

Defunct literary magazines published in the United Kingdom
Monthly magazines published in the United Kingdom
Magazines established in 1887
Magazines disestablished in 1891